Bård Frydenlund (born 11 July 1972) is the director (CEO) at Eidsvoll 1814 in Norway. He is the former CEO at Næs Jernverksmuseum.

He is an author and a historian, and has a background as researcher and teacher at IAKH – Department of Archaeology, Conservation and History, University of Oslo. His field of expertise is Norway and Scandinavia in the age of revolutions - political history, trade networks and social elites.

Frydenlund was formerly head of the Student Parliament of the University of Oslo (1998) and policy advisor for former rector (vice chancellor) Kaare R. Norum at the University of Oslo (2000-2001). He has been working as an advisor at the Ministry of Education and Research (2004), as book review editor at Historisk Tidsskrift (Norway) (2005-2009), and as board member of the University of Oslo (2010-2012). In 2009 he published the biography of Norway's first prime minister Peder Anker. Frydenlund is currently chairman of ABM-Media AS (the media house for the archive, library and museum's sector in Norway).

Selected bibliography

External links 
 Bård Frydenlunds author page on Gyldendal Norsk Forlag
 Bård Frydenlunds author page on Aschehoug
 Eidsvoll 1814 website

References

1972 births
Living people
People from Ringerike (municipality)
21st-century Norwegian historians
Norwegian non-fiction writers
Directors of museums in Norway